Yadrinsky Uyezd (Я́дринский уе́зд) was one of the subdivisions of the Kazan Governorate of the Russian Empire. It was situated in the western part of the governorate. Its administrative centre was Yadrin.

Demographics
At the time of the Russian Empire Census of 1897, Yadrinsky Uyezd had a population of 154,493. Of these, 90.9% spoke Chuvash and 9.0% Russian as their native language.

References

 
Uezds of Kazan Governorate
Kazan Governorate